A photo gallery software is a computer software that let users to manage and display photos and pictures and, in some cases, videos and other multimedia content. Features could include classify, display, share, tagging, etc.

The following is a comparison of photo gallery publishing software.
Some are desktop applications, others are server side applications.

For software that just allows you locally organize photos in your filesystem see image organizer.

Desktop applications

Server applications

See also
Comparison of image viewers

References

Photo gallery software